TLB may refer to:

Science and technology
 Adaptive transmit load balancing or balance-tlb, a Linux bonding driver mode
 Canon TLb, a 35 mm camera
 Translation lookaside buffer, a computer memory cache
 Turcicum Leaf Blight, also known as Northern corn leaf blight

Transport
 Atlas Atlantique Airlines (ICAO airline code), France
 Talybont railway station (National Rail station code), Gwynedd, Wales

Other uses
 Army Top Level Budget, the responsibility of the UK Deputy Chief of the General Staff
 The Living Bible, a personal paraphrase of the Bible